Caesar Okhuti (born 7 October 1990) is a Ugandan coach and retired footballer. He captained Arua Hill Sports Club from the FUFA Big League to the Ugandan Premier League in 2021. Okhuti was part of the promoted Onduparaka FC team in 2016. He once played for Express and KCCA FC but was loaned back to Onduparaka FC for the 2016/17 season. He won the league with Bunamwaya SC in 2010 and KCCA FC in 2016. He retired from professional football on 17 August 2021 after winning the StarTimes FUFA Big League Final with Arua Hill SC.

Senior career
Okhuti started his career in 2007 with a brace for Arua-based Ugandan Super League debutants Ediofe Hills FC against URA FC. He was called up to the Ugandan national team by coach Laszlo Csaba later that year. The following year, Bunamwaya S.C. bought him for a national record 12 million shillings. A back injury in September 2008 laid him off for two months but he returned to end the season as third highest scorer with 18 goals. He was named in the 2009 African Championship of Nations Uganda squad. In 2010, Okhuti helped Bunamwaya win their first USL title.

On 20 May 2011, Okhuti signed a contract with Vissai Ninh Bình in Vietnam's V.League 1 where he scored four goals within three months. He returned in January 2012 to play for Bunamwaya. 

In 2014, Okhuti joined South Sudan's El Nasir, but the following season returned home to help Arua-based Onduparaka FC get promotion in the Ugandan Big League.

On Saturday 5 December 2015 at Addis Ababa Stadium in Ethiopia, Okhuti headed in the only goal against Rwanda to win a record-extending 14th CECAFA Senior Challenge Cup for Uganda. It was the fourth time Uganda had defeated Rwanda in the final (2003, 2009, 1011, 2015) and first time Uganda's Serbian Coach Milutin "Micho" Sredojevic had won it, having lost four years behind to Uganda while coaching Rwanda. Caesar scored three goals in the tournament like his captain and St. Mary's Kitende old boy Farouk Miya. Okhuti attributes his comeback to "change of attitude". It was his second CECAFA (Council for East and Central African Football Associations) Cup win. 

Okhuti was included in the Ugandan squad for CHAN 2016.

As a free agent, he joined KCCA FC. In September 2016, KCCA loaned him for six months to Onduparaka, the newly promoted side from Arua. FUFA cleared him to play for Onduparaka on 28 September 2016 and three days later he scored once in a 4-3 win over SC Villa. He remained there up to 2019.

Okhuti then signed for Arua Hill SC and made his debut against Blacks Power on 25 March 2021, scoring once in a 3-1 win. After captaining the FUFA Big League Invincibles to the Ugandan Premier League with five goals in nine matches, Okhuti won the BL Final at the FUFA Technical Centre in Njeru on 17 August 2021 and retired from playing professional football.

See also
 Arua Hill Sports Club
 Ediofe Hills FC
 Express FC
 KCCA FC
 Onduparaka FC
 Vipers SC
 Uganda national football team

References

External links

Caesar Okhuti Signs For KCCA FC

1990 births
2011 African Nations Championship players
Association football defenders
Association football midfielders
Express FC players
Living people
Sportspeople from Kampala
Ugandan footballers
Uganda international footballers
Vipers SC players
People educated at St. Joseph's College Ombaci
Uganda A' international footballers
Ugandan expatriate footballers
Ugandan expatriate sportspeople in South Sudan
Ugandan expatriate sportspeople in Vietnam
Expatriate footballers in Vietnam
Expatriate footballers in South Sudan
2016 African Nations Championship players